New Humanist is a quarterly magazine, published by the Rationalist Association in the UK, that focuses on culture, news, philosophy, and science from a sceptical perspective.

History
The New Humanist has been in print for more than 131 years; starting out life as Watts's Literary Guide, founded by C. A. Watts in November 1885. It later became The Literary Guide and Rationalist Review (1894–1954), Humanist (1956–1971) and the New Humanist in 1972.

Notable columnists have included Laurie Taylor, Simon Hoggart and Sally Feldman.

In 2003 Hazhir Teimourian, a reviewer for the magazine, quit over a controversial cartoon depicting Christ slumped in the arms of the Virgin Mary.

In 2005 Caspar Melville took over as managing editor of the magazine and CEO of the Rationalist Association. Daniel Trilling assumed the position of Editor in 2013. Samira Shackle became Editor in Spring 2020.

References

External links
 The Literary Guide and Rationalist Review – HathiTrust

Freethought
Humanist literature
Magazines established in 1885
1885 establishments in the United Kingdom
Philosophy magazines
Political magazines published in the United Kingdom
Quarterly magazines published in the United Kingdom
Magazines published in London
Scientific skepticism mass media